Allan Henry Gilliver (born 3 August 1944) is a former professional footballer who played nearly 300 games and scored nearly 100 goals in the Football League during the 1960s and 1970s. He also appeared in the North American Soccer League for the Baltimore Comets. He played as a forward.

He started his career with Huddersfield Town in 1961 after being spotted by a talent scout, and went on to play for several English clubs including Bradford City who he signed for in 1972 and again in 1978. After his playing career ended his connection with Bradford City continued through a number of roles including groundsman, safety officer and commercial manager. A testimonial match was held for him at Valley Parade in 1998 and he retired in 2007.

His dementia diagnosis in the early 2010s is thought to be connected with a career of heading the football and has led to the setting up of Bradford Memory Walks which take place in aid of the Alzheimer's Society.

References

External links
 Baltimore Comets: Allan Gilliver

1944 births
Living people
Footballers from Rotherham
English footballers
Association football forwards
Huddersfield Town A.F.C. players
Blackburn Rovers F.C. players
Rotherham United F.C. players
Brighton & Hove Albion F.C. players
Lincoln City F.C. players
Bradford City A.F.C. players
Stockport County F.C. players
Baltimore Comets players
Boston United F.C. players
Gainsborough Trinity F.C. players
English Football League players
North American Soccer League (1968–1984) players
English expatriate sportspeople in the United States
Expatriate soccer players in the United States
English expatriate footballers